The Mahabat Khan Mosque (Pashto and ), sometimes spelt Mohabbat Khan Mosque, is a 17th-century Mughal-era mosque in Peshawar, Pakistan. The mosque was built in 1630, and named after the Mughal governor of Peshawar, Nawab Mohabat Khan Kamboh, father of Nawab Khairandesh Khan Kamboh. The mosque's white marble façade is considered to be one of Peshawar's most iconic sights.

History
The mosque was built between 1660 and 1670 by the Mughals, on what was the highest point in the old city.

The minarets of the Mohabbat Khan Mosque were frequently used in Sikh times for hanging prisoners. Five people per day were hanged from the minarets, `as a substitute for the gallows’. Following the Soviet invasion of Afghanistan, refugee tribal elders would congregate in the mosque in order to forge unity amongst Afghans against the Soviets.

Layout
The mosque is 30,155 square feet in size. Its open courtyard has a centrally-located ablution pool and a single row of rooms lining the exterior walls.

Architecture

The prayer hall occupies the west side. The hall is flanked by two tall minarets, which are divided into three sections. The façade of the prayer hall is also capped by 6 smaller decorative minarets that flank the mosque's 5 arched entryways, with an additional 2 minarets flanking the set of 6. The prayer hall is capped by 3 fluted domes. The roofline rises from the outer edges, towards the centre by a series of four small incremental height increases. The roofline is embellished with numerous merlons. The top of the mosque's white marble façade is capped by cavettos, or concave moulding.

5 arched portals offer entry into the main prayer hall. The central arch is the tallest, and features cusped arches typical of the Mughal style. The central arch is flanked by two slightly shorter un-cusped arches, that are designed in the Persian and Central Asian style. These arches are flanked by a smaller arch decorated in a similar style, and row of 7 small arched portals are found above the tip of each arch. The three central arched portals are embellished with muqarnas above the row of 7 mini-arched portals, while the outermost arches are instead decorated with ghalib kari, or a network of ribs made of stucco and plaster that are applied to curved surfaces in the archways for decorative purposes. Archways into the mosque are also flanked by vegetal motifs along their upper curves, which unlike the green motifs at Badshahi Mosque, are multi-coloured.

Both the interior and exterior feature panels are embellished with floral motifs and Quranic calligraphy. The interior of the prayer hall is sheltered beneath the three low fluted domes and is eloquently painted with floral and geometric designs.

Gallery

See also 
Badshahi Mosque
Wazir Khan Mosque
Shah Jahan Mosque
List of mosques in Pakistan
Islamic architecture
Timeline of Islamic history

References

1630 establishments in India
Mughal mosques
Mosques in Peshawar
Religious buildings and structures completed in 1630
Mosque buildings with domes